Edward Collins is a former Canadian figure skater. He was the 1957–58 bronze and 1959 national silver medalist.

Results

References

skatabase

Living people
Canadian male single skaters
Year of birth missing (living people)